Ben no Naishi (1220s?–ca. 1270?) was a 13th-century Japanese court lady, poet and memoirist.

Ben no Naishi was the daughter of the poet and painter Fujiwara Nobuzane; her younger sister Shosho no Naishi was also a poet. She served at court as a lady in waiting to Emperor Go-Fukakusa from 1243 until the Emperor's abdication in 1259. During her time as a lady in waiting she was responsible for the three imperial regalia of Japan. Her memoir, Ben no naisha nikki, begins with Go-Fukakusa's accession aged three in 1246, and ends (the text is damaged) in 1252.

References

Year of birth unknown
Year of death unknown
13th-century births
13th-century deaths
Japanese diarists
Women memoirists
13th-century Japanese women writers
Japanese women poets